John Joseph Benedict Hunt, Baron Hunt of Tanworth,  (23 October 1919 – 17 July 2008) was a British civil servant.

Born in Minehead, Somerset to Major A. L. Hunt MC by his wife Daphne (née Ashton Case), he was educated at Downside School and Magdalene College, Cambridge before joining the Civil Service in 1946.

Hunt became Cabinet Secretary from 1973 to 1979, being the first Roman Catholic to hold this post since its creation in 1916.

Lord Hunt of Tanworth married firstly in 1941 The Hon. Mary Robinson (died 1971) and, by his second wife Madeleine, Lady Charles (née Hume), was a brother-in-law of the late Basil Hume, Cardinal Archbishop of Westminster.

Honours and awards
Hunt was appointed a Companion of the Order of the Bath (CB) in the 1968 Birthday Honours, promoted Knight Commander of the Order of the Bath (KCB) in the 1973 Birthday Honours and was advanced to Knight Grand Cross of the Order of the Bath (GCB) in the 1977 Birthday Honours.

Hunt was created a Life Peer with the title Baron Hunt of Tanworth, of Stratford-upon-Avon in the County of Warwickshire on 8 February 1980,

Lord Hunt was also appointed Officier de la Légion d'honneur by President François Mitterrand and Knight Commander of the Order of Pius IX by Pope John Paul II.

In popular culture

Hunt was one of the more powerful cabinet secretaries, and was seen by many political figures (especially in the Second Wilson Ministry) as an "imperialist" who relished expanding the power of his remit. His uncanny mastery of procedure and ability to steer meetings to the conclusion he wished made him a considerable source of inspiration for the character of Sir Humphrey Appleby on the television series Yes, Minister and Yes, Prime Minister.

References

External links

Burke's Peerage & Baronetage

1919 births
2008 deaths
People educated at Downside School
People from Minehead
Alumni of Magdalene College, Cambridge
British Roman Catholics
Hunt of Tanworth 
Knights Grand Cross of the Order of the Bath
Royal Naval Volunteer Reserve personnel of World War II
Cabinet Secretaries (United Kingdom)
Officiers of the Légion d'honneur
Knights Commander with Star of the Order of Pope Pius IX
Life peers created by Elizabeth II